Four Seasons Resort Hualalai at Historic Kaūpūlehu is a AAA Five Diamond rated Four Seasons resort in Kaūpūlehu, on the Kona-Kohala Coast of the island of Hawaii.

The tsunami from the 2011 Tōhoku earthquake damaged the resort and forced it to close for six weeks (until April 30) for repairs. The tsunami affected the pool area and grounds, a restaurant, and twelve guest rooms. In 2020, the resort underwent a multi-million dollar renovation.

Location

The hotel is located on the Island of Hawaii, in Kailua-Kona, on the site of an ancient Hawaiian fishing village of Kaūpūlehu.

Development 
Project development began in 1989, with initial construction on the  estimated $200 million resort starting in October 1990, with Taisei Hawaii Corp. and Kajima Engineering & Construction Inc. as the general contractors. 358 rooms were planned by Kaupulehu Venture, with investment by Cosmo World Corp.  However, a global economic slowdown stopped development in 1991, and the project languished until 1994 when it was completely redesigned from the bottom up. The hotel opened for business in 1996.

The Hualalai Resort master plan was produced by Belt Collins & Associates.  During the planning process, several anchialine pools and a historic Hawaiian trail were found on the shoreline.  The saltwater pools were restored and preserved by site designers as part of the development and their natural features emphasized as an attraction.  HKS Hill Glazier Studio of Palo Alto, California  received the commission for the Four Seasons hotel.  To keep costs down, the developer, hotel operator, and architects collaborated to reduce the initial size of each room, saving millions.

Design 

Hill Glazier Architects designed two-story bungalows arranged in the shape of a crescent, forming a kipuka.  The "low-scale post-and-beam structures" of ancient Hawaiian villages influenced the style, incorporating "broad overhangs, exposed eaves, and loosely defined interior and exterior spaces".  Structures and hotel services were designed as "open-air pavilions with unobstructed views of the Pacific Ocean".  To add authenticity, Honduran Mahogany, koa, bamboo, and teak were used in the exterior and interior.  Rooms are furnished in Hawaiian-style decor, with the addition of Native Hawaiian bedspreads.  Landscape design was completed by Bill Bensley Design Group of Thailand.

After almost eight years of planning, development, and construction, the resort opened in September 1996.

Features

Hotel
Guest services selects employees for the resort after subjecting them to at least five different interviews.

Restaurants
The hotel currently has three restaurants: Hualalai Grille, Ulu Ocean Grill + Sushi Lounge, and Beach Tree Bar & Lounge.  Menus typically feature Big Island-grown and raised items such as avocado, goat cheese, red and yellow tomatoes, mushrooms, lobster, white organic honey, and baby abalone.

Alan Wong directed the Hualalai Grille from 2003 to 2008, and was followed by executive sous chef James Ebreo.

Spa
 tropical garden spa, featuring eleven different types of massages and facials.

Cultural Center
The Kaupulehu Cultural Center teaches visitors about Hawaiian culture and history with programs and lessons held throughout the week.  Guests can take ukulele classes and learn the art of hula and lei making.  The center also hosts a collection of Native Hawaiian art, including 11 commissioned paintings by artist Herb Kawainui Kane.

Critical review
Four Seasons Hualalai was among the 100 of Travel + Leisure's world's  best resorts awards in a readers poll in 2007, 2008, and 2009, and ranked in several "top lists" by Zagat Surveys. Condé Nast Traveler placed the resort on their "Gold list" for best resorts since 2005.

 Four Seasons Resort Hualalai was one of only three AAA Five Diamond Award winning hotels in Hawaii. In 2010 it added the Forbes (formerly Mobil) Five-Star Award, one of only two in the state. A par-72 18-hole golf course was designed by Jack Nicklaus. Golf Magazine ranked the course one of the best in America to play in 2002 and it annually hosts the Champions Tour's Mitsubishi Electric Championship at Hualalai. Other amenities include spa services, six pools, and fitness facilities.

In 2010, TripAdvisor named the resort the top celebrity honeymoon hotel destination.

Notes

References

Further reading

Hotels in Hawaii (island)
Resorts in Hawaii
Golf clubs and courses in Hawaii
Buildings and structures in Hawaii County, Hawaii
Tourist attractions in Hawaii County, Hawaii
Four Seasons hotels and resorts
Hotels established in 1996
1996 establishments in Hawaii